Formula One, abbreviated to F1, is the highest class of open-wheeled auto racing defined by the Fédération Internationale de l'Automobile (FIA), motorsport's world governing body. The "formula" in the name refers to a set of rules to which all participants and cars must conform. Each year, the F1 World Championship season is held. Drivers are awarded points based on their finishing position in each race, and the driver who accumulates the most points over each championship is crowned that year's World Drivers' Champion.

Seven-time champions Michael Schumacher and Lewis Hamilton hold the record for the most championships. Fernando Alonso has entered more  than anyone else and also holds the record for the most Grand Prix starts. The United Kingdom is the most represented country, having produced 163 drivers. Ten countries have been represented by just one. China became the latest country to be represented by a driver when Zhou Guanyu made his Formula One debut at the  driving for Alfa Romeo.

Drivers

Drivers who only participated in Friday practice and who were not actually entered for the race are not included.

By country
Drivers from 41 countries have entered a World Championship race. The United Kingdom is the most heavily represented with 164 drivers. Second is the United States with 158; between 1950 and 1960 the American Indianapolis 500 race, then rarely contested by drivers from outside the United States, was part of the World Championship. A total of 36 American drivers have started World Championship races sanctioned by the FIA. Third is Italy with 99. Statistics are accurate as of the 2023 Bahrain Grand Prix.

Notes

References
General

Twite, Mike. "De Tomaso: Italian Precision with Brute Force", in Northey, Tom, editor. World of Automobiles, Volume 5, pp. 531–2. London: Orbis, 1974.

Specific

External links 
 
 FIA official website

 
Drivers
Formula One drivers